Cat Burglar is a 2022 animated interactive film created by Charlie Brooker and co-written by supervising director Mike Hollingsworth and director James Bowman, with Annabel Jones as an executive producer. Debuting on Netflix on 22 February 2022, the viewer plays cartoon cat burglar named Rowdy who is trying to steal a valuable artwork from a museum which is being protected by security guard dog named Peanut. The viewer must answer a series of trivia questions correctly in order to advance the story, and avoid Rowdy losing his three remaining lives. The film pays homage to the works of animator Tex Avery. 

It was nominated for two Children's and Family Emmy Awards, including one for Outstanding Interactive Media. The soundtrack's composer, Christopher Willis, won the Outstanding Music Direction and Composition for an Animated Program category.

Plot 
Rowdy (James Adomian), a feline burglar, learns that a museum is displaying a valuable artwork which he decides to steal. Peanut (Alan Lee), the museum's canine security guard, is ordered by the museum's director (Trevor Devall) to protect the artwork from being stolen. The story sees Rowdy attempting to break into the museum and successfully steal the painting without being caught by Peanut, which is done by the viewer answering a series of trivia questions. Every time the viewer gets the questions right, the story progresses. The cartoon ends when either Rowdy successfully steals the artwork and wins, or when Rowdy runs out of lives and loses.

Voice cast 
 Alan Lee as Peanut
 James Adomian as Rowdy Cat, Priest, Devil
 Trevor Devall as Museum Director (Hari de Balzac), God

Production 
The film was released on 22 February 2022. According to Netflix, the typical runtime is 15 minutes, and the film offers around 90 minutes of animation depending on the viewer's route through the story. The film consists of several hundred segments; the animation, sound effects and music required dovetailing so that each path between segments progresses seamlessly. With Christopher Willis in charge of music, the soundtrack was performed by a London orchestra of 40 musicians.

Cat Burglar was the first production by Charlie Brooker and Annabel Jones's production company Broke and Bones since it was acquired by Netflix. The pair were previously involved in interactive fiction in the 2018 special Bandersnatch, part of the science fiction anthology series Black Mirror. Though a fan of the genre, Brooker had not previously worked in animation. Mike Hollingsworth served as Supervising Director. It was inspired by the animated shorts made by Tex Avery for Metro-Goldwyn-Mayer (MGM). Hollingsworth was a fan and named his child "Avery" after the "King of Cartoons", while Brooker liked the "timeless, surreal anarchy" of the cartoons, which were "smart and brutal and subversive". Ideas for animation, such as the style of Rowdy's death, were primarily pitched by Hollingsworth and James Bowman, and then refined or rejected. Brooker pushed for a high level of violence in the cartoon.

Brooker's previous experience with interactive fiction led him to be wary of complicated story paths. He was interested in the viewer determining the storyline outcome indirectly, rather than through direct choices as with Bandersnatch. He arrived at the idea of a skill-based game, like those in the franchise Dragon's Lair. The questions in Cat Burglar are intended to emphasize speed of answering over knowledge. The interactive work was the first by Netflix to incorporate trivia, preceding the April 2022 game Trivia Quest, an adaptation of Trivia Crack with episodic trivia questions framed within a narrative story. The animation was done by Boulder Media.

Reception 
Cat Burglar received generally positive reviews. Stuart Jeffries gave it 4 out of 5 stars in The Guardian, praising the music and the homages to classic cartoons. Lauren O'Neill of i also gave Cat Burglar 4 out of 5 stars, liking the interactive elements which make the viewer less passive in comparison to most streamed television. Caroline Framke of Variety enjoyed the interactive aspects, saying that it was tempting to mess up to see what kind of twists the show would take. Ed Power of The Daily Telegraph, however, was more critical, giving it 3 out of 5 stars, liking the animation, but feeling frustrated by the interactive elements, arguing that they felt "tacked on".

Accolades

References

External links 
 
 
 
Official Making of Cat Burglar also on YouTube
Official soundtrack playlist by Christopher Willis on YouTube

2020s American animated films
2020s interactive fiction
2022 animated films
2022 comedy films
English-language Netflix original films
Interactive television
Netflix Animation films
American animated films
American comedy films
2020s English-language films
American adult animated films
Interactive films
Children's and Family Emmy Award winners
American animated featurettes